This article is part of the history of rail transport by country series

The history of rail transport in the Comoros began in about 1907.  The only railway to be built in the Comoros was a  narrow gauge industrial railway.  Its owner was a plantation society, the Société Comores Bambaoa.  The railway carried only freight traffic. It is not known when the railway was abandoned.

See also

History of the Comoros
Transport in the Comoros

References

External links

Comoros
Rail
Rail transport in the Comoros